Erligou station is a station on Line 6 and Line 16 of the Beijing Subway. The station opened on 18 March 2023.

History
Erligou station did not enter into operation along with Line 6 Phase I on December 30, 2012. Both Line 6 and Line 16 platforms opened on March 18, 2023. The platform for Line 16 is above the Line 6 platform.

Location
The station is located at the intersection of the north-south Sanlihe Road with the east-west thoroughfare known as Chegongzhuang West Road to the west of Sanlihe Road and Chegongzhuang Street to the east.

Station Layout 
Both the line 6 and line 16 stations have underground side platforms. There are 5 exits, lettered A1, A2, B, C and D. Exits A1 and A2 are accessible via elevators.

References

Beijing Subway stations in Haidian District
Beijing Subway stations in Xicheng District